Carousel Shopping Center, opened in 1995, is a modern shopping mall located in the Bakırköy district of Istanbul, Turkey.

The shopping center with its 76,500 m² area has 117 shops, fast food restaurants, cafeterias, entertainment center and movie theaters. There are 7 elevators and 12 escalators providing easy access to 1.5 million visitors monthly. Car parking is free for the shoppers.

Its attractions include discussion panels, music recitals, an art gallery where exhibitions by both amateur and professional artists are held, book-signing sessions by famous authors, and special weeks featuring different countries.

In 1996, Carousel was honored with "Jean-Louis Solal Marketing Award" of the International Council of Shopping Centers (ICSC).

See also
 List of shopping malls in Istanbul

References
 From the Grand Bazaar to the modern shopping centers in Turkey. Turkish Council of Shopping Centers & Retailers (AMPD)

External links
 Official website
 International Council of Shopping Centers

Shopping malls in Istanbul
Bakırköy